Woh is a Pakistani horror television series written by Syed Atif Ali and directed and produced by Angeline Malik under the banner Angelic Films.  The serial has two seasons, first aired in 2013 on Hum TV while second season titled, Woh Dobara aired in 2014. The serial is considered one of the earliest works on Horror genre by the Pakistani media.

Plot

Season 1
A horror story, revolving around a ghost making things fly, and scaring and torturing people.

Season 2
The story starts with Zubair, who shifts his family to a new house where they begin the wedding arrangements of Zubair's brother Umair. The family begins to notice paranormal action occurring around the house yet give it no significance due to wedding preparations and celebrations.

Series overview

Cast

Season 1
 Arij Fatyma
 Shamoon Abbasi
 Rubina Ashraf
 Imran Ashraf
 Naila Jaffri as Ruqaiya
 Farah Nadir as Iram
 Fouzia Mushtaq
 Falak Naz

Season 2
 Yasra Rizvi as Yasmeen
 Shahood Alvi as Zubair
 Sana Askari as Iman
 Sakina Samo as Bibi Sahiba
 Sultana Zafar as Bua Begum
 Ali Abbas as Umair
 Bilal Khan as Ali
 Seema Sehr
 Naila Jaffery
 Shahid Nizami
 Saba Arif
 Fareeha Khan

References

External links 
 
 
 

Urdu-language television
Hum TV original programming
Pakistani horror fiction television series